Fellows of the Royal Society elected in 1835.

Fellows

 Robert Alexander (1795–1843), barrister
 Edward Blackett Beaumont (1802–1878)
 Albert William Beetham  (1802–1895)
 William Borrer (1781–1862), botanist
 James Burnes (1801–1862), surgeon
 John Davidson (1797–1836), traveller
 Joseph Delafield (d. c.1842)
 Richard Dobson (c.1773–1847), surgeon
 John Edye (1789–1873), naval designer
 Charles Elliott (1776–1856), Indian Civil Service
 George William Featherstonhaugh (1780–1866), geologist
 James Alexander Gordon (1793–1872), physician
 John Hamett (d. 1847)
 John Greathed Harris (c.1774–1850)
 Robert John Harvey (1785–1860)
 William Bentinck Letham Hawkins (1802–1894)
 Thomas Jones (1775–1852)
 Thomas Leybourn (1770–1840)
 Thomas Mayo (1790–1871), physician
 William Molesworth (1810–1855), politician
 George Moore (c.1777–1859), architect
 Arthur Morgan (1801–1870), actuary
 Charles Henry Oakes (1810–1864)
 Benjamin Oliveira (1806–1865), politician
 John Henry Pelly (1777–1852), businessman
 William Symonds (1782–1856), naval surveyor
 Richard Taunton (c.1774–1838)
 William Tite (1798–1873), architect
 Martin Tupper (1780–1844), physician
 Samuel Warren (1807–1877), lawyer
 James Wigram (1793–1866), barrister, MP
 Charles James Blasius Williams (1805–1889), physician

Foreign members

 Jean-Baptiste Élie de Beaumont (1798–1874), French geologist
 Frédéric Cuvier (1773–1838), French zoologist
 Marie Jean Pierre Flourens (1794–1867), French physiologist
 Peter Andreas Hansen (1795–1874), Danish/German astronomer
 Otto August Rosenberger (1800–1890), German astronomer

References

1835 in science
1835
1835 in the United Kingdom